The pee curl (Dutch: plaskrul) is a urinal that is placed in multiple different locations in centre of Amsterdam as a public toilet. The design was made in the end of the 19th century from the Dienst der Publieke Werken.

The curl is made of a spiral-shaped iron plate that is carried half a metre above the ground by four iron legs. The top half of the plate is perforated so that it can be seen through at eye-level. The urinal sheet-iron is painted dark green. The floor is made of tiles with a natural stone slab in an upright position and a urine gutter. The curls are connected to the sewer and are cleaned by the local municipality with water from the canal. The curls come in a single or double version and some curls are equipped with a roof.

History 

In 1859 inventor Leijs proposed to place hollow pillars. However the design of the curl was chosen. The key element was transparency. It was easier for officers on duty to determine if there were multiple people in the urinal; because in the 19th and most of the 20th century such facilities were used by homosexual men to have sexual intercourse. In 1980 around 40 curls were used for sexual intercourse, but at the end of the 1990s this practice was as good as gone.

The first curls where placed around 1870. The first double curl was placed in 1877 at the Paleis voor Volksvlijt. In 1916 a new design was made by the architect Jan van der Mey. The ornamentation at the top was removed and the urinal was provided with a  half-cylindrical cap.

In 1928 the urinal commission was founded. They decided the locations of the curls and moved on with building the public urinals via the Kiosk Organisation of Amsterdam. This included a telephone, water tap and a toilet. These facilities were closed after some time because of the high costs.

In 2008 all pee curls were galvanised and restored. The city had thirty-five pee curls in 2017. From those are two made by the "van der Meymodel". The pee curls to the side of the canals are kept in place by the local government to keep people from publicly urinating and thereby falling in the canal. On average 15 people drown each year in the canal due to multiple causes.

Pee-right 

The urinals are focused on men. This comes from the reasoning of the urinal commission that the urinals are intended for 'the man who has his job on the street'. In addition the costs for completely closed toilets are higher and could be used for lewd conduct. These were the reasons to propose to close most of these facilities in the 1960s. This led from the function as meeting point to a protest from the gay movement.

On January the 24th 1970, Dolle Mina took action to close the pee curls with pink ribbons to demand 'peeright'. In 1985 the urinal commission gave positive advice to place automatic public toilets, but just in that time the commission was shut down and this plan was cancelled.

The man-focused design came to the spotlights in 2017 because a woman in Amsterdam was ticketed for public urinating. The offender did not use the pee curl because of the possibility of cleavage while crouching. She refused to pay the fine because of discrimination against woman. According to the judge, the pee curls are suitable for women and she was forced to pay the fine. This led to the national urinalpeeaction Zeikwijf that got international attention. Amsterdam knew in 2017 besides the urinals in total three public toilets that are suited for woman. This is lower than in comparable cities. In 2017 Berlin had 177 public toilets and Paris 150 public toilets.

New urinals 
The government of Amsterdam places temporary urinals (Dutch: plaskruizen) and urinals that can be retracted underground particularly for the nightlife public. In 2016 such a retractable urinal was placed at Paleis op de Dam that had two men urinals and one for women.

References

External links 
 Collection of photos of pee curls in Amsterdam

Buildings and structures in Amsterdam
Urinals